Gatling Gears is a shooter video game developed by Vanguard Games and published by Electronic Arts. In the game, players control dieselpunk mechs from an isometric perspective to destroy waves of enemies. Gatling Gears was released on Xbox Live Arcade on May 11, 2011, June 28, 2011 for PlayStation Network and on August 30, 2011 for Windows.

Gatling Gears was made by the same team that created the turn-based strategy game Greed Corp and is set in the same world. Some iconic elements from Greed Corp are present in Gatling Gears, such as collapsing land and walker mechs.

Reception
GameZone gave the game an 8/10, stating "It can be a repetitive process because each level requires you to blow up everything in sight, but the combination of challenge and reward makes the repetition a minute issue. If you’re in dire need of a solid twin-stick shooter fix, give Gatling Gears a go."

References 

2011 video games
Dieselpunk video games
Electronic Arts games
Twin-stick shooters
PlayStation 3 games
PlayStation Network games
Steampunk video games
Video games developed in the Netherlands
Xbox 360 Live Arcade games
Windows games